Tintah can refer to a location in the United States:

 The city of Tintah, Minnesota
 Tintah Township, Traverse County, Minnesota